Patzún is a town, with a population of 26,632 (2018 census) and a municipality in the Chimaltenango department of Guatemala.

History

Originally a Kaqchikel village founded in the 12th century, it belong to the Iximche kingdom until the latter was conquered by the Spaniards in the 1520s.  From then it was under the jurisdiction of the Franciscans and remain such for the most part of the Spanish Colony.

In 1895, the town was visited by archeologist Alfred Percival Maudslay and his wife, Anne Cary Maudslay.  Maudslay's wife described the town from a Victorian Era perspective in their book A glimpse at Guatemala:
"A ride of about five leagues first across the same high tableland, then through the lovely valley of La Sierra, brought us to Patzun, a town of some importance, well placed and rather picturesque. The day had been so charming that we had been tempted to dawdle much on the way in lazy enjoyment of the beauty of the woodland slopes and the views of the volcanoes, so that it was about 4 o'clock when we rode up to the inn. The accommodation offered to us was not attractive, for the bedrooms were like cupboards, airless and dark, and we were about to search in the town for an empty room, when the patrona (English: female landlord), after much hesitation, agreed to allow us the use of the "Sala" (English: "living room") as a bedroom ; so leaving Gorgonio and the boys to clean the room out, and to try and get rid of some of the too numerous fleas, we wandered off to see the sights of the town. Our steps of course gravitated towards the Plaza, which, however, was not in itself attractive; but the groups of Indian wayfarers seated around fires, cooking their suppers or settling themselves for the night, were exceedingly picturesque. The people here are far better looking than those we had seen at Antigua and Santa Maria, and they appear to belong to a finer and stronger race, with faces less grotesque and costumes much more attractive."

Anne Maudslay continues:
"Whilst we were watching the groups in the Plaza our attention was attracted by the sound of music, and three shabby-looking fat ladinos came in sight, playing violin, trombone, and drum, and heralding a procession of gaily-dressed Indians. Some of the men wearing long gowns trimmed with red, with turbans wound round their heads, bore on their shoulders a platform supporting the image of a Saint, which was being carried round the town on its way to the church, there to be deposited for the night in readiness for the fiesta on the morrow. Then followed others who may have been priests or were perhaps only officials of a "cofradia" (or brotherhood), for their costumes were not orthodox priestly garments, and then a number of women dressed in clean huipils and enaguas, and wearing long white veils, with the part covering the head thickly embroidered in white silk. Each woman carried a lighted candle in her hand, wrapped round with a green canna-leaf to shade it from the wind. We followed the procession through the streets to the church, where the image was deposited, and the women (still candle in hand, but each with the canna-leaf placed on the top of her shawl, neatly folded by her side) knelt in a circle and sang a hymn before the procession dispersed. We returned to find our room swept but hardly clean, and after a very bad supper were not sorry to turn into our comfortable camp-beds."

Culture

Traditional local wardrobe

Anne Maudslay described the local wardrobe as follows in A glimpse at Guatemala: The dress of the men is rather Eastern in effect, and consists of a long loose sleeveless garment woven from the undyed wool of the black sheep. It is open at the sides, is longer in the back than in front, and is usually drawn in round the waist with a belt. Loose trousers of the same material reach to the knee, and below them appear the embroidered edges of the loose white cotton drawers. The huipils (English: blouse) of the women are woven in stripes and brightly colored with native dyes, and the home-made "enagua" (English: skirt) of blue and white striped cotton is fastened round the waist over the huipil by an embroidered belt with hanging ends. Every woman carries over her arm a small striped cotton shawl to throw over her bare neck and arms in the cool of the evening, and both men and women wear colored handkerchiefs knotted round their heads. We made many efforts to buy some of the good huipils, but without success, and the women quite frightened Gorgonio by the vehemence of their indignation at being asked to sell their garments. This is hardly to be wondered at, for we learnt that their stock of clothes usually included only one huipil in the wearing and one in the loom, and it must take a long time to work the elaborate patterns in cross-stitch with which they are embroidered."

Gallery

Climate

Patzún has a subtropical highland climate (Köppen: Cwb).

Geographic location 

It is almost completely surrounded by Chimaltenango Department municipalities:

See also

References

Bibliography

External links
http://www.patzun.gob.gt/portal/

Municipalities of the Chimaltenango Department